South Kensington may refer to:

South Kensington, a district in West London
South Kensington tube station
South Kensington (film), 2001 British film starring Elle Macpherson and Rupert Everett
South Kensington, Maryland, a suburb of Washington DC in the United States
South Kensington railway station, a suburban railway station in Melbourne, Australia